The 1974 Cork Junior Hurling Championship was the 77th staging of the Cork Junior Hurling Championship since its establishment by the Cork County Board.

On 3 November 1974, Watergrasshill won the championship following a 3-08 to 0-10 defeat of Rath Luirc in the final at the Castletownroche GAA Grounds. It remains their only championship title in the grade.

References

Cork Junior Hurling Championship
Cork Junior Hurling Championship